Çäkçäk (pronounced , Yañalif: Cəkcək, Tatar Cyrillic: Чәкчәк or чәк-чәк, çäk-çäk; , chaqchaq; ; ; , chak-chak; , säk-säk, Kazakh "чак-чак", frequently anglicized as chak-chak, is a Tatar sweet. It is particularly popular in Tatarstan and Bashkortostan, and is recognized as Tatarstan's national sweet in Russian Federation.

Çäkçäk is made from unleavened dough cut and rolled into hazelnut-sized balls, which are then deep-fried in oil. Optionally hazelnuts or dried fruit (e.g.apricot and raisin) are added to the mixture. The fried balls are stacked in a mound in a special mold and drenched with hot honey. After cooling and hardening, çäkçäk may be optionally decorated with hazelnuts and dried fruits.

Traditional wedding çäkçäk is of bigger size and is often covered with candies and dragées. The biggest çäkçäk (4026,4 kg) was prepared on 14 June 2018 during the opening of FIFA fans in Kazan.

Types
If the dough is fried as noodles, çäkçäk is called Boxara käläwäse (Бохара кәләвәсе, i.e. Bukharan käläwä ).
Kazakh shek-shek is similar to Boxara käläwäse.
Uzbek chakchak comes in half rounded balls, noodles and flakes types.
Tajik chakchak comes in both types, as balls and as noodles.

See also
 List of doughnut varieties
 List of fried dough varieties
 List of Russian dishes
 Tatar culture
 Tatar cuisine
 Lokma (a similar dish originating in Turkey)
 Struffoli
 Sachima (a similar dish in Manchu cuisine)
 Gavvalu (a similar dish in India)
 Funnel cake

References

External links

 My Home — Tatar cuisine recipes

Bashkir cuisine
Kazakhstani cuisine
Kyrgyz cuisine
Tatar cuisine
Tajik cuisine
Uzbekistani cuisine
Fried dough
Central Asian desserts
Russian desserts